Hermes Trismegistus (from , "Hermes the Thrice-Greatest";) is a legendary Hellenistic figure that originated as a syncretic combination of the Greek god Hermes and the Egyptian god Thoth. He is the purported author of the Hermetica, a widely diverse series of ancient and medieval pseudepigraphical texts that lay the basis of various philosophical systems known as Hermeticism.

The wisdom attributed to this figure in antiquity combined a knowledge of both the material and the spiritual world, which rendered the writings attributed to him of great relevance to those who were interested in the interrelationship between the material and the divine.

The figure of Hermes Trismegistus can also be found in both Islamic and Baháʼí writings. In those traditions, Hermes Trismegistus has been associated with the prophet Idris.

Origin and identity

Hermes Trismegistus may be associated with the Greek god Hermes and the Egyptian god Thoth. Greeks in the Ptolemaic Kingdom of Egypt recognized the equivalence of Hermes and Thoth through the interpretatio graeca. Consequently, the two gods were worshiped as one, in what had been the Temple of Thoth in Khemenu, which was known in the Hellenistic period as Hermopolis.

Hermes, the Greek god of interpretive communication, was combined with Thoth, the Egyptian god of wisdom. The Egyptian priest and polymath Imhotep had been deified long after his death and therefore assimilated to Thoth in the classical and Hellenistic periods. The renowned scribe Amenhotep and a wise man named Teôs were coequal deities of wisdom, science, and medicine; and, thus, they were placed alongside Imhotep in shrines dedicated to Thoth–Hermes during the Ptolemaic Kingdom.

A Mycenaean Greek reference to a deity or semi-deity called ti-ri-se-ro-e (Tris Hḗrōs, "thrice or triple hero") was found on two Linear B clay tablets at Pylos and could be connected to the later epithet "thrice great", Trismegistos, applied to Hermes/Thoth. On the aforementioned PY Tn 316 tablet—as well as other Linear B tablets found in Pylos, Knossos, and Thebes—there appears the name of the deity "Hermes" as e-ma-ha, but not in any apparent connection with the "Trisheros". This interpretation of poorly understood Mycenaean material is disputed, since Hermes Trismegistus is not referenced in any of the copious sources before he emerges in Hellenistic Egypt.

Cicero enumerates several deities referred to as "Hermes": a "fourth Mercury (Hermes) was the son of the Nile, whose name may not be spoken by the Egyptians"; and "the fifth, who is worshiped by the people of Pheneus [in Arcadia], is said to have killed Argus Panoptes, and for this reason to have fled to Egypt, and to have given the Egyptians their laws and alphabet: he it is whom the Egyptians call Theyt". The most likely interpretation of this passage is as two variants on the same syncretism of Greek Hermes and Egyptian Thoth (or sometimes other gods): the fourth (where Hermes turns out "actually" to have been a "son of the Nile," i.e. a native god) being viewed from the Egyptian perspective, the fifth (who went from Greece to Egypt) being viewed from the Greek-Arcadian perspective. Both of these early references in Cicero (most ancient Trismegistus material is from the early centuries AD) corroborate the view that Thrice-Great Hermes originated in Hellenistic Egypt through syncretism between Greek and Egyptian gods (the Hermetica refer most often to Thoth and Amun).

The Hermetic literature among the Egyptians, which was concerned with conjuring spirits and animating statues, inform the oldest Hellenistic writings on Greco-Babylonian astrology and on the newly developed practice of alchemy. In a parallel tradition, Hermetic philosophy rationalized and systematized religious cult practices and offered the adept a means of personal ascension from the constraints of physical being. This latter tradition has led to the confusion of Hermeticism with Gnosticism, which was developing contemporaneously.

The epithet "thrice great"
Fowden asserts that the first datable occurrences of the epithet "thrice great" are in the Legatio of Athenagoras of Athens and in a fragment from Philo of Byblos, circa AD 64–141. However, in a later work, Copenhaver reports that this epithet is first found in the minutes of a meeting of the council of the Ibis cult, held in 172 BC near Memphis in Egypt. Hart explains that the epithet is derived from an epithet of Thoth found at the Temple of Esna, "Thoth the great, the great, the great."

Many Christian writers, including Lactantius, Augustine, Marsilio Ficino, Campanella, and Giovanni Pico della Mirandola, as well as Giordano Bruno, considered Hermes Trismegistus to be a wise pagan prophet who foresaw the coming of Christianity. They believed in the existence of a prisca theologia, a single, true theology that threads through all religions. It was given by God to man in antiquity and passed through a series of prophets, which included Zoroaster and Plato. In order to demonstrate the verity of the prisca theologia, Christians appropriated the Hermetic teachings for their own purposes. By this account, Hermes Trismegistus was either a contemporary of Moses, or the third in a line of men named Hermes, i.e. Enoch, Noah, and the Egyptian priest king who is known to us as Hermes Trismegistus on account of being the greatest priest, philosopher, and king.

Another explanation, in the Suda (10th century), is that "He was called Trismegistus on account of his praise of the trinity, saying there is one divine nature in the trinity."

Hermetic writings

During the Middle Ages and the Renaissance the Hermetica enjoyed great prestige and were popular among alchemists. Hermes was also strongly associated with astrology, for example by the influential Islamic astrologer Abu Ma'shar al-Balkhi (787–886). The "Hermetic tradition" consequently refers to alchemy, magic, astrology, and related subjects. The texts are usually divided into two categories: the philosophical and the technical hermetica. The former deals mainly with philosophy, and the latter with practical magic, potions, and alchemy. The expression "hermetically sealed" comes from the alchemical procedure to make the Philosopher's Stone. This required a mixture of materials to be placed in a glass vessel which was sealed by fusing the neck closed, a procedure known as the Seal of Hermes. The vessel was then heated for 30 to 40 days.

During the Renaissance, it was accepted that Hermes Trismegistus was a contemporary of Moses. However, after Isaac Casaubon's demonstration in 1614 that the Hermetic writings must postdate the advent of Christianity, the whole of Renaissance Hermeticism collapsed. As to their actual authorship:

Various critical editions of the Hermetica have been published in modern academia, such as Hermetica by Brian Copenhaver.

Islamic tradition

Antoine Faivre, in The Eternal Hermes (1995), has pointed out that Hermes Trismegistus has a place in the Islamic tradition, although the name Hermes does not appear in the Qur'an. Hagiographers and chroniclers of the first centuries of the Islamic Hijrah quickly identified Hermes Trismegistus with Idris, the Islamic prophet of surahs 19.57 and 21.85,  whom Muslims also identified with Enoch (cf. Genesis 5.18–24). According to the account of the Persian astrologer Abu Ma'shar al-Balkhi (787–886), Idris/Hermes was termed "Thrice-Wise" Hermes Trismegistus because he had a threefold origin. The first Hermes, comparable to Thoth, was a "civilizing hero", an initiator into the mysteries of the divine science and wisdom that animate the world; he carved the principles of this sacred science in hieroglyphs. The second Hermes, in Babylon, was the initiator of Pythagoras. The third Hermes was the first teacher of alchemy. "A faceless prophet," writes the Islamicist Pierre Lory, "Hermes possesses no concrete or salient characteristics, differing in this regard from most of the major figures of the Bible and the Quran."

The star-worshipping sect known as the Sabians of Harran also believed that their doctrine descended from Hermes Trismegistus.

There are least twenty Arabic Hermetica extant. While some of these Arabic Hermetic writings were translated from Greek or Middle-Persian, some were originally written in Arabic. Hermetic fragments are also found in the works of Arabic alchemists such as Jabir ibn Hayyan (died –816, cited an early version of the Emerald Tablet in his ) and Ibn Umayl (quoted and commented upon Hermetic sayings throughout his work, among them also a commentary on the Emerald Tablet).

Baháʼí writings
Bahá'u'lláh, founder of the Baháʼí Faith, identifies Idris with Hermes in his Tablet on the Uncompounded Reality.

In literature
The first verses of the Baudelaire's Les Fleurs du mal refer to "Satan Trismegistus" who pulls human puppet strings to rule the world. That image echoed Plato's dialogues. The verses are the following: On evil’s pillow, / Satan Trismegistus rocks our spirits—enchanted by / the subtle chemist, the will’s / precious metals turn to vapor.

References

Bibliography
Aufrère, Sydney H. (2008) (in French). Thot Hermès l'Egyptien: De l'infiniment grand à l'infiniment petit. Paris: L'Harmattan. .
Bull, Christian H. 2018. The Tradition of Hermes Trismegistus: The Egyptian Priestly Figure as a Teacher of Hellenized Wisdom. Leiden: Brill. (the standard reference work on the subject)
CACIORGNA, Marilena and GUERRINI, Roberto: Il pavimento del duomo di Siena. L'arte della tarsia marmorea dal XIV al XIX secolo fonti e simologia. Siena 2004.
CACIORGNA, Marilena: Studi interdisciplinari sul pavimento del duomo di Siena. Atti el convegno internazionale di studi chiesa della SS. Annunziata 27 e 28 settembre 2002. Siena 2005.
Copenhaver, Brian P. (1995). Hermetica: the Greek Corpus Hermeticum and the Latin Asclepius in a new English translation, with notes and introduction, Cambridge; New York: Cambridge University Press, 1995 .
Ebeling, Florian, The secret history of Hermes Trismegistus: Hermeticism from ancient to modern times [Translated from the German by David Lorton] (Cornell University Press: Ithaca, 2007), .
Festugière, A.-J.,La révélation d'Hermès Trismégiste. 2e éd., 3 vol., Paris 1981.
Fowden, Garth, 1986. The Egyptian Hermes: A Historical Approach to the Late Pagan Mind. Cambridge: Cambridge University Press (Princeton University Press, 1993): deals with Thoth (Hermes) from his most primitive known conception to his later evolution into Hermes Trismegistus, as well as the many books and scripts attributed to him.
Hornung, Erik (2001). The Secret Lore of Egypt: Its Impact on the West. Translated by David Lorton. Ithaca: Cornell University Press. .
Lupini, Carmelo, s.v. Ermete Trismegisto in "Dizionario delle Scienze e delle Tecniche di Grecia e Roma", Roma 2010, vol. 1.
Merkel, Ingrid and Allen G. Debus, 1988. Hermeticism and the Renaissance: intellectual history and the occult in early modern Europe Folger Shakespeare Library 
  (the standard reference for Hermes in the Arabic-Islamic world)
Van den Kerchove, Anna 2012. La voie d’Hermès: Pratiques rituelles et traités hermétiques. Leiden: Brill.
Yates, Frances A., Giordano Bruno and the Hermetic Tradition. University of Chicago Press, 1964. .

External links

 Corpus Hermeticum along with the complete text of G.R.S. Mead's classic work, Thrice Greatest Hermes
 Hermetic Research is a portal on Hermetic study and discussion
 Dan Merkur, "Stages of Ascension in Hermetic Rebirth"
 Asclepius — Latin text of the edition Paris: Henricus Stephanus 1505.
 Pimander—Latin translation by Marsilio Ficino, Milano: Damianus de Mediolano, 1493.
 THE DIVINE PYMANDER of Hermes Mercurius Trismegistus in English
 Online Galleries, History of Science Collections, University of Oklahoma Libraries—High resolution images of works by Hermes Trismegistus in JPEG and TIFF format.

Greek alchemists
Ancient astrologers
Egyptian gods
Epithets of Hermes
Hellenistic Egyptian deities
Hellenistic religion
Hermeticism
Magic gods
Mythological characters
Occult writers
People whose existence is disputed
Primordial teachers